Donta Abron (born July 4, 1972) is a former American football player who played college ball at Northern Arizona Lumberjacks and professional ball for the Baltimore Stallions of the Canadian Football League, Albany Firebirds and the Grand Rapids Rampage of the Arena Football League.

Pro career
On March 22, 1995, Donta was signed by the Baltimore Stallions.
Abron was the member of the Albany Firebirds for the 1997 season. In 1998, he played for the Grand Rapids Ramapge. He was moved from Widereciver/Defensive Back to Defensive Speacilist next to Raphael Ball. In 1999, he did not play for the Rampage but was placed on recallable waivers

References

1972 births
American players of Canadian football
Northern Arizona Lumberjacks football players
Albany Firebirds players
Baltimore Stallions players
Grand Rapids Rampage players
Living people